Kola Union Jogendra Girls High School   is a higher secondary school  and was established in 1956 and it is managed by the Department of Education. It is located in Panskura -II block of Purba Medinipur district of West Bengal. The school consists of Grades from 5 to 12. The school is a "Girls School" and it doesn't has an attached pre-primary section. Bengali is the medium of instructions in this school. In this school academic session starts in April.

References 

Girls' schools in West Bengal
High schools and secondary schools in West Bengal
Schools in Purba Medinipur district
Educational institutions established in 1956
1956 establishments in West Bengal